The 2017–18 Winthrop Eagles men's basketball team represented Winthrop University during the 2017–18 NCAA Division I men's basketball season. The Eagles, led by sixth-year head coach Pat Kelsey, played their home games at the Winthrop Coliseum in Rock Hill, South Carolina as members of the Big South Conference. They finished the season 19–12, 12–6 in Big South play to finish in a tie for second place. They defeated Gardner–Webb in the quarterfinals of the Big South tournament before losing in the semifinals to Radford.

Previous season
The Eagles finished the season 26–7, 15–3 in Big South play to finish in a tie for the regular season Big South championship. As the No. 1 seed in the Big South tournament, they defeated Charleston Southern, Gardner–Webb, and Campbell to win the tournament championship. As a result, they received the conference's automatic bid to the NCAA tournament, their first bid since 2010. In the NCAA Tournament, they lost in the first round to Butler.

On March 21, 2017, head coach Pat Kelsey initially left Winthrop to take the head coaching job at Massachusetts, but backed out two days later citing "personal reasons" and returned to Winthrop.

Preseason 
The Eagles were picked to finish second in conference play in a preseason Big South poll. Senior G/F Xavier Cooks was named to the All-Big South preseason first team.

Roster

Schedule and results

|-
!colspan=9 style=| Non-conference regular season

|-
!colspan=9 style=| Big South regular season

|-
!colspan=9 style=| Big South tournament

References

Winthrop Eagles men's basketball seasons
Winthrop
2018 in sports in South Carolina
2017 in sports in South Carolina